National Stock Exchange of India Limited (NSE) is one of the leading stock exchanges in India, based in Mumbai. NSE is under the ownership of various financial institutions such as banks and insurance companies. It is the world's largest derivatives exchange by number of contracts traded and the third largest in cash equities by number of trades for the calendar year 2022. It is one of the largest stock exchanges in the world by market capitalization. NSE's flagship index, the NIFTY 50, a 50 stock index is used extensively by investors in India and around the world as a barometer of the Indian capital market. The NIFTY 50 index was launched in 1996 by NSE. 

The Economic Times estimates that as of April 2018, 6 crore (60 million) retail investors had invested their savings in stocks in India, either through direct purchases of equities or through mutual funds. Earlier, the Bimal Jalan Committee report estimated that barely 3% of India's population invested in the stock market, as compared to 27% in the United States and 10% in China.

History
National Stock Exchange was incorporated in the year 1992 to bring about transparency in the Indian equity markets. NSE was set up at the behest of the Government of India, based on the recommendations laid out by the Pherwani committee in 1991 and the blueprint created by Ravi Narain, RH Patil and SS Nadkarni in 1992. Instead of trading memberships being confined to a group of brokers, NSE ensured that anyone who was qualified, experienced, and met the minimum financial requirements was allowed to trade.

NSE commenced operations in 1994 starting with the wholesale debt market (WDM) segment and equities segment. It was the first exchange in India to introduce an electronic trading facility. Within one year of the start of its operations, the daily turnover on NSE exceeded that of the BSE.

Operations in the derivatives segment commenced in 2000. In August 2008, NSE introduced currency derivatives.

NSE EMERGE 

NSE EMERGE is NSE's new initiative for Small and medium-sized enterprises (SME) & Startup companies in India. These companies can get listed on NSE without an Initial public offering (IPO). This platform will help SME's & Startups connect with investors and help them with the raising of funds. In August 2019, the 200th company listed on NSE's SME platform.

Markets 
The National Stock Exchange of India Limited (NSE) commenced trading in derivatives with the launch of index futures on 12 June 2000. The futures and options segment of NSE has made a global mark. In the Futures and Options segment, trading in the NIFTY 50 Index, NIFTY IT index, NIFTY Bank Index, NIFTY Next 50 index, and single stock futures are available. Trading in Mini Nifty Futures & Options and Long term Options on NIFTY 50 are also available.

On 3 May 2012, the National Stock exchange launched derivative contracts (futures and options) on FTSE 100, the widely tracked index of the UK equity stock market. This was the first of its kind index of the UK equity stock market launched in India. FTSE 100 includes the 100 of largest UK-listed blue-chip companies and has given returns of 17.8 percent on investment over three years. The index constitutes 85.6 per cent of UK's equity market cap.

On 10 January 2013, the National Stock Exchange signed a letter of intent with the Japan Exchange Group, Inc. (JPX) on preparing for the launch of NIFTY 50 Index futures, a representative stock price index of India, on the Osaka Securities Exchange Co., Ltd. (OSE), a subsidiary of JPX.

Moving forward, both parties will make preparations for the listing of yen-denominated NIFTY 50 On 13 May 2013, NSE launched India's first dedicated debt platform to provide a liquid and transparent trading platform for debt-related products.

Stakeholders
The key domestic investors which hold a stake in NSE include Life Insurance Corporation, State Bank of India, IFCI Limited, IDFC Limited and Stock Holding Corporation of India Limited. Key global investors include Gagil FDI Limited, GS Strategic Investments Limited, SAIF II SE Investments Mauritius Limited, Aranda Investments (Mauritius) Pte Limited, and PI Opportunities Fund I.

Financial literacy

NSE has collaborated with several universities like Gokhale Institute of Politics & Economics (GIPE), Pune, Bharati Vidyapeeth Deemed University (BVDU), Pune, Guru Gobind Singh Indraprastha University, Delhi, the Ravenshaw University of Cuttack and Punjabi University, Patiala, among others to offer MBA and BBA courses. NSE has also provided mock market simulation software called NSE Learn to Trade (NLT) to develop investment, trading, and portfolio management skills among the students. The simulation software is very similar to the software currently being used by the market professionals and helps students to learn how to trade in the markets. NSE also conducts online examinations and awards certification, under its Certification in Financial Markets (NCFM) programs.

At present, certifications are available in 46 modules, covering different sectors of financial and capital markets, both at the beginner and advanced levels. The list of various modules can be found at the official site of NSE India. In addition, since August 2009, it has offered a short-term course called NSE Certified Capital Market Professional (NCCMP).

Criticism and controversies

Market manipulation 
The Indian stock exchanges BSE and NSE have witnessed several corruption scandals. At various times, numerous Indian corporate groups have been charged with stock manipulation.

NSE co-location case

On 8 July 2015, Sucheta Dalal wrote an article on Moneylife alleging that some NSE employees were leaking sensitive data related to high-frequency trading or co-location servers to a select set of market participants so that they could trade faster than their competitors. NSE alleged defamation in the article by Moneylife. On 22 July 2015, NSE filed a  suit against the publication. However, on 9 September 2015, the Bombay High Court dismissed the case and fined NSE  in this defamation case against Moneylife. The High Court asked NSE to pay  to each journalist Debashis Basu and Sucheta Dalal and the remaining  to two hospitals.

The Bombay High Court has stayed the order on costs for a period of two weeks, pending the hearing of the appeal filed by NSE.

In May 2019 SEBI has debarred NSE from accessing the markets for a period of 6 months. While NSE confirmed this will not impact their functioning, they won't be able to list their IPO or introduce any new trading products for that period. Additionally, the watchdog also ordered NSE to disgorge Rs 624.9 crores (along with accrued interest for the period), an amount equivalent to the profits it made from the unfair trade practice of co-location servers they provided during the period from 2010–11 to 2013–14.

The board also passed orders against 16 individuals including former managing directors and CEOs Ravi Narain and Chitra Ramakrishna ordering them to disgorge 25% of their salaries during that period along with interest. All money is to be paid into the Investor protection and education fund. These individuals have also been debarred from the markets or holding any position in a listed company for a period of five years.

See also 
  
 List of companies listed on the National Stock Exchange of India 
 Economy of India 
 List of stock exchanges 
 Bombay Stock Exchange
 Stock market crashes in India 
 List of stock market crashes and bear markets 
 Trading day 
 Muhurat trading 
 Clause 49 
 Securities and Exchange Board of India

Notes

References

External links

 

 

 
Stock exchanges in India
Financial services companies based in Mumbai
Financial services companies established in 1992
1992 establishments in Maharashtra